Ali Loghmani (born in 1962, Mashhad) is an Iranian cinematographer who is known for his work on films by prominent Iranian directors such as Khosrow Sinai, Dariush Mehrjui, and Asghar Farhadi. Loghmani's works have been nominated for the best cinematography in Iranian festivals and have won some awards.

Selected filmography

References

External links
Ali Loghmani at CIC (Chronography of Iranian Cinema)

Ali Loghmani at Imvbox
Ali Loghmani at BFI
Ali Loghmani Films Presented at Cannes 
Variety | A Review of The Beautiful City with a comment on Loghmani's work 
Film Journal | A review of Djomeh with a comment on Loghmani's work

Iranian cinematographers
1962 births
Living people